Winkfield is a surname. Notable people with the name include:

 Alexandra Winkfield Timpson (1946–2016), English children's rights campaigner
 Jimmy Winkfield (–1974), American jockey and horse trainer
 Karen Winkfield (born 1970),  American radiation oncologist and physician-scientist
 Trevor Winkfield (born 1944), English artist and writer

See also 

 Unca Eliza Winkfield
 Winkfield